Calhoun is a city in Gordon County, Georgia, United States. As of the 2020 census, the city had a population of 16,949. Calhoun is the county seat of Gordon County.

History
In December 1827, Georgia had already claimed the Cherokee lands that became Gordon County and other counties. A small town called "Dawsonville" was created and founded in Gordon County, named for the owner of an early general store. Dawsonville was later renamed "Calhoun" to honor U.S. Senator John C. Calhoun, following his death in 1850.

Gordon County's inferior court called an election for the selection of the county seat, offering voters a choice between a site on the Western & Atlantic Railroad (near Adairsville) or a site more centrally located within the county. Voters chose a site along the railroad, so the inferior court designated Calhoun as county seat in 1851. The legislature incorporated Calhoun in an act approved on January 12, 1852.

On January 5, 1861, Georgia seceded from the Union as a prelude to the American Civil War. Calhounians joined the Confederacy. Most warfare took place elsewhere, but on May 16, 1864, Calhoun was near where the Union General William Tecumseh Sherman and Confederate General Joseph E. Johnston postured before the Battle of Adairsville during Sherman's Atlanta Campaign. Oakleigh, the home of Dr. Wall, was used by Sherman as his headquarters at that time.

A tornado on March 20, 1888, leveled much of Calhoun. A devastating fire on October 23 of that year destroyed most of what remained.

Geography
Calhoun is located west of the center of Gordon County at  (34.499898, -84.942584), along the Oostanaula River where it is joined by Oothkalooga Creek. It is part of the Coosa River/Alabama River watershed.

U.S. Route 41 passes through the center of town as Wall Street, and Interstate 75 runs along the eastern edge of the city, with access from Exits 310, 312, 315, 317, and 318. I-75 leads north  to Chattanooga, Tennessee, and south  to Atlanta. US-41, running parallel to I-75, leads north  to Resaca and south  to Adairsville. Georgia State Route 156 runs west out of town as West Line Street, leading  to Armuchee, and heads east out of town as Red Bud Road, leading  to Red Bud. Georgia State Route 373 (East Line Street and Dews Pond Road) leads east  to Cash. Georgia State Route 136 (North River Street) leads northwest  to LaFayette. Georgia State Route 53 passes through the southern part of Calhoun, leading east  to Fairmount and southwest  to Rome.

Climate
The climate in this area is characterized by relatively high temperatures and evenly distributed precipitation throughout the year. According to the Köppen Climate Classification system, Calhoun has a humid subtropical climate, abbreviated "Cfa" on climate maps.

Demographics

2020 census

As of the 2020 United States Census, there were 16,949 people, 6,088 households, and 4,001 families residing in the city.

2000 census
As of the census of 2000, there were 10,667 people, 4,049 households, and 2,672 families residing in the city. The racial makeup of the city was 77.91% White, 7.56% African American, 0.42% Native American, 1.00% Asian, 0.14% Pacific Islander, 11.61% from other races, and 1.36% from two or more races.  17.07% of the population was Hispanic or Latino of any race.

There were 4,049 households, out of which 30.9% had children under the age of 18 living with them, 47.8% were married couples living together, 13.9% had a female householder with no husband present, and 34.0% were non-families. 28.8% of all households were made up of individuals, and 12.0% had someone living alone who was 65 years of age or older.  The average household size was 2.56 and the average family size was 3.07.

In the city, the population was spread out, with 24.2% under the age of 18, 11.2% from 18 to 24, 31.0% from 25 to 44, 20.1% from 45 to 64, and 13.5% who were 65 years of age or older.  The median age was 34 years. For every 100 females, there were 98.9 males.  For every 100 females age 18 and over, there were 96.7 males.

The median income for a household in the city was $33,618, and the median income for a family was $42,310. Males had a median income of $27,616 versus $25,018 for females. The per capita income for the city was $19,887.  About 12.5% of families and 16.8% of the population were below the poverty line, including 20.8% of those under age 18 and 19.1% of those age 65 or over.

Arts and culture

Museums and other points of interest
The Rock Garden containing miniature castles, churches, and other structures
New Echota Historic Site, first Cherokee capital
Roland Hayes Museum at the Harris Arts Center
Oakleigh/Gordon County Historical Society
Premium Outlets of Calhoun
Buc-ee's
Phil Reeve Stadium

Education

Calhoun City School District 
The Calhoun City School District serves preschool to grade twelve, and consists of two elementary schools, a middle school, and a high school, separate from the county school district. The district has 166 full-time teachers and over 2,666 students.

Calhoun Primary School - grades K-2
Calhoun Elementary School - grade 3-5
Calhoun Middle School - grades 6-8
Calhoun High School

Gordon County School District 
The Gordon County School District holds grades pre-school to grade twelve, that consists of six elementary schools, two middle schools and two high schools, serving the area outside the city limits. The district has 365 full-time teachers and over 6,259 students.

 Red Bud Elementary Grades Pre-K-5
 W.L Swain Elementary Grades Pre-K-5
 Belwood Elementary School Pre-K-5
 Sonoraville Elementary School Pre-K-5
 Fairmount Elementary School Pre-K-5
 Max V. Tolbert Elementary School Pre-K-5
 Ashworth Middle School Grades 6-8
 Red Bud Middle School Grades 6-8
 Gordon Central High School Grades 9-12
 Sonoraville High School Grades 9-12

Private school 
Downing Clark Academy, Inc.

Religious schools

Seventh-day Adventist 
 John L. Coble Elementary School - K-8th grades
 Georgia-Cumberland Academy - boarding 9-12 high school

Higher education 
Georgia Northwestern Technical College (formerly Coosa Valley Technical College)

Media

Radio and TV 
Although well outside of metro Atlanta, Calhoun is considered part of the Atlanta television market, the ninth-largest DMA according to Nielsen Media Research. Cable TV service is offered through Comcast Cable, which provides one public, educational, and government access (PEG) cable TV channel named WEBS cable 3.

There are now four radio stations having Calhoun as their city of license:

 WEBS AM 1030, playing oldies, simulcasts on local Xfinity cable channel 3; station originally broadcast on AM 1110, from approximately 1965–1990.
 WIPK FM 94.5, owned by WEBS, went on-air in late 2011 with a country music format.
 WJTH AM 900, playing country music; frequency was earlier assigned to WCGA, which broadcast from approximately 1950–1975.
 W269CC 101.7, transmitting WJTH programming from WJTH tower, but having nearby Adairsville as the city of license.
 WLOJ-LP 102.9, religious (owned and operated by the Calhoun Seventh-day Adventist Church ).

Many other stations from Rome, Atlanta, and Chattanooga are also available across northwest Georgia, though reception of these often depends on weather.

There is also a semi-weekly newspaper, The Calhoun Times.

Notable people

 Elias Boudinot (1802–1839), born Gallegina Uwati, also known as Buck Watie, Cherokee leader who believed that acculturation was critical to the tribe's survival; influential in the period of removal to the West
 Charlie Culberson Major League Baseball player
 Kris Durham, professional football player; wide receiver for the Oakland Raiders
 Roland Hayes (1887–1977), world-renowned lyric tenor, considered the first African-American male concert artist to receive wide acclaim both at home and internationally, born here and attended Calhoun schools
 Bert Lance (1931–2013), businessman, and former director of the Office of Management and Budget during the Carter administration 
 James Beverly Langford (1922-1996), lawyer, businessman, and Georgia state legislator
 John Meadows III (1944–2018), Businessman, Mayor of Calhoun, and Georgia state legislator
 Sequoyah (English: George Gist or George Guess) (c.1767–1843), Cherokee, inventor of the Cherokee Syllabary. This was the only time in recorded history that a member of a non-literate people independently created an effective writing system. He was also the namesake of California's giant Sequoia sempervirens redwood tree.
 William Thompson (1848–1918), Olympic gold medal winner
 Stand Watie (1806–1871), Cherokee leader and Confederate general
 Dale Willis (1938–), Major League Baseball player

References

External links
 
 City of Calhoun official website
 Calhoun-Gordon Arts Council
 Calhoun Times
 New Echota Historic Site
 Calhoun, GA. May 16, 1864 historical marker

Cities in Georgia (U.S. state)
Cities in Gordon County, Georgia
Micropolitan areas of Georgia (U.S. state)
County seats in Georgia (U.S. state)